Count Kristóf Niczky de Niczk (February 11, 1725 in Sümeg – December 26, 1787 in Buda) was an influential Habsburg bureaucrat under Maria Theresa and Joseph II.

Biography 

He rose to the rank of count in 1765. He was Temes County's first leader after 1779.

During Joseph II's rule, he was president of Hungary's Vice-regal Council, the Consilium locumtentiale.

Legacy 

Nițchidorf, Romania, was named after count Kristóf Niczky.

External links
 nitzkydorf.de - Official home page of Niţchidorf, Romania,

Footnotes 

1725 births
1787 deaths
People from Sümeg
Hungarian nobility
Judges royal